Nanda is a 2009 Indian Kannada-language film directed by R. Anantha Raju and starring Shiva Rajkumar and Sandhya.

Cast
Shiva Rajkumar as Nanda
Sandhya as Kavya 
Rangayana Raghu as  Bhai Jaan
Sharath Lohithaswa as Ranganath 
Avinash as Khaderbahi 
Srinath
Shobaraj
Sharan
Kishore
Mahin
Bhavya
Vanitha Vasu

Soundtrack

The music for the film and soundtracks were composed by V. Manohar. The album has five tracks.

Reception 
A critic from Rediff.com wrote that "The film made by Anantha Raju fails to showcase any freshness in the actor's performance". A critic from The Times of India said that "It's a Shivrajkumar show all the way in this movie directed by Anantharaju".

References

2000s Kannada-language films